Ankhiya is a village from Nokhara tehsil of Barmer district in the Indian state of Rajasthan.

External links

Villages in Barmer district